Lady Mary Agatha Russell (1853 – 23 April 1933) was the daughter of the 1st Earl Russell and Frances, Countess Russell, and the aunt of Bertrand Russell. She was the co-editor of her mother's posthumously published memoirs, Lady John Russell: A Memoir with Selections from Her Diaries and Correspondence.

In 1912, Russell published a compilation of quotations and selections from authors, philosophers, poets, etc. entitled Golden Grain: Thoughts of Many Minds. The entries in Golden Grain are organized by date through a single year. It was prefaced by Frederic Harrison and published by James Nisbet and Company of London in 1912.

References

External links
 

Daughters of British earls
1853 births
1933 deaths
British writers
Residents of Pembroke Lodge, Richmond Park